The 2014 international cricket season is from May 2014 to September 2014. The Ireland cricket team was scheduled to play three One Day Internationals in Lahore, Pakistan, but they were cancelled after the 2014 Jinnah International Airport attack.

Season overview

Rankings
The following are the rankings at the beginning of the season.

May

2014 ACC Premier League

Sri Lanka in Ireland

England in Scotland

Sri Lanka in England

June

New Zealand in the West Indies

India in Bangladesh

2014 ICC World Cricket League Division Four

Points Table

Final standings

Final Placings

July

Netherlands in Scotland

Bicentenary Celebration match

South Africa in Sri Lanka

India in England

Afghanistan in Zimbabwe

August

Pakistan in Sri Lanka

South Africa in Zimbabwe

Bangladesh in the West Indies

Zimbabwe Triangular Series

September

South African women in England

Scotland in Ireland

South African women against Ireland in England

During the same England tour in 2014, South African women's team has played 3 T20I against Ireland in the English city Solihull.

New Zealand women in West Indies

2014 Asian Games

First round

Knockout stage

Final standing

References

External links
 2014 season on ESPN Cricinfo

2014 in cricket